Lepturges infilatus is a species of longhorn beetles of the subfamily Lamiinae. It was described by Henry Walter Bates in 1872.

References

Lepturges
Beetles described in 1872